Parai Attam is a special type of dance in Tamil culture in which folks beat parai and dance to its rhythm.

References

Dances of India
Tamil dance styles